This is a list of people to have been Lord Lieutenant of County Londonderry. 

There were lieutenants of counties in Ireland until the reign of James II, when they were renamed governors. The office of Lord Lieutenant was recreated on 23 August 1831.

Governors

John Skeffington, Viscount Massareene: 1678- 
Henry Conyngham, 1st Earl Conyngham: –1781
Thomas Conolly: 1761–1795
Edward Cary: 1789–1794
Robert Stewart, Viscount Castlereagh: 1805–1822
Charles Vane, 3rd Marquess of Londonderry:1822–1831

Lord Lieutenants
The 1st Baron Garvagh: 7 October 1831 – 20 August 1840
Sir Robert Ferguson, 2nd Bt.: 1840 – 13 March 1860
Acheson Lyle: 10 April 1860 – 22 April 1870
Robert Peel Dawson: 25 June 1870 – 2 September 1877
Sir Henry Bruce, 3rd Bt.: 1877 – 8 December 1907
John Cooke: 24 January 1908 – December 1910
David Cleghorn Hogg: 7 January 1911 – 22 August 1914
James Jackson Clark: 31 March 1915 – 1926
Maurice Marcus McCausland: 30 October 1926 – 14 January 1938
Sir Charles Stronge, 7th Bt.: 28 June 1938 – 5 December 1939
 William Lowry Lenox-Conyngham: 2 February 1940 – 5 June 1957
Sir Dudley McCorkell: 10 October 1957 – 30 May 1960
Sir Henry Mulholland, 1st Bt.: 17 October 1960 – 1965
John C. Drennan, CBE, JP: 1965 - 1974
Colonel Sir Michael McCorkell: 13 June 1975 – 2000
Sir Denis Desmond : 14 June 2000 – 11 May 2018
Helen Rosemary Alison Millar: 12 June 2018 – present

Deputy lieutenants
A deputy lieutenant of County Londonderry is commissioned by the Lord Lieutenant of County Londonderry. Deputy lieutenants support the work of the lord-lieutenant. There can be several deputy lieutenants at any time, depending on the population of the county. Their appointment does not terminate with the changing of the lord-lieutenant, but they usually retire at age 75.

21st Century
29 October 2015: Helen Mark

See also
 Lord Lieutenant of the City of Londonderry

References

External links
Official website

 
Londonderry, County